Sakun can refer to:

 Sokkan, Fereydunshahr, village in Iran
 Sukur language of Nigeria, also called Sakun